The General Assembly of Budapest is a unicameral body consisting of 33 members, which consist of the 23 mayors of the districts, 9 from the electoral lists of political parties, and the Mayor of Budapest (who is elected directly). Each term for the mayor and assembly members lasts five years.

2019 Election Results

Mayoral
Result of the mayoral election:

General Assembly

List of Mayors

Council history

General Assembly of Budapest

See also 
 National Assembly (Hungary)
 Budapest

References

Organizations with year of establishment missing
Organisations based in Budapest
Local government in Hungary
Budapest